Alcide Legrand (born 17 February 1962) is a French former wrestler. He competed in the men's freestyle 82 kg at the 1992 Summer Olympics.

References

External links
 

1962 births
Living people
French male sport wrestlers
Olympic wrestlers of France
Wrestlers at the 1992 Summer Olympics
People from Bergerac, Dordogne
Sportspeople from Dordogne